AAGB may refer to:

 American Ambulance Great Britain, a humanitarian organisation founded in 1940
 Astrological Association of Great Britain, a British astrological organisation